Kurt St. Thomas is an American filmmaker, author and radio DJ who has worked in the radio and music industry since 1985. During his time at the radio station WFNX in Boston he became acquainted with the band Nirvana, and was the first person to play the album Nevermind on the radio. St. Thomas later interviewed the band for Nevermind It's an Interview and co-authored the book Nirvana: The Chosen Rejects.

Early life
St. Thomas was born in Virginia and raised in Pennsylvania. He attended Ashland University, graduating with a BA in radio and television in 1985.

Radio career
After college, St. Thomas worked at Syracuse radio station WAQX-FM in 1985, then moved to work at WGIR-FM in Manchester, New Hampshire, in 1986.

From 1987–1995, St. Thomas worked at WFNX in Boston, serving as the station's program, music, and production director.

In 2005, St. Thomas started working at KROQ as a disc jockey. In 2008, he launched Houndstooth Radio, an internet radio station broadcasting from the garage of his house; the station featured mostly new independent artists. He later went back to KROQ and produced a show called Jonesy's Jukebox with Steve Jones from the Sex Pistols; he then spent seven years doing weekends and fill-in at KROQ.

On August 17, 2012, WFNX, now an internet-only station, re-hired St. Thomas as its executive music producer. He worked there until the station was shut down five months later.

Relationship with Nirvana
St. Thomas became interested in the band Nirvana after their 1989 debut album Bleach and meeting the band backstage after a concert in Cambridge, Massachusetts, the same year. At 7 pm on August 29, 1991, St. Thomas over the WFNX airwaves gave Nirvana's album Nevermind its world premiere by playing the album from start to finish. He invited the band to play at the WFNX's anniversary party the night before the album was released.

In 1992 he was asked to record with Nirvana the band's official interview album: Nevermind It's an Interview.

He also co-authored a book about the band Nirvana: The Chosen Rejects.

Film career

Captive Audience
In 1996, St. Thomas began collaborating with Mike Gioscia in making what would become the feature film Captive Audience. The black and white film focused on a strange bond between an overnight disc-jockey and a gun-toting intruder. The film won seven international Film Festival awards including Board Of Directors Award Nashville Film Festival 1999, three at the 1999 Planet Indie Film Festival in Toronto, Best Feature Editing Rhode Island International Film Festival 2000 and Best Feature Magnolia Independent Film Festival 2000.

The Red Right Hand
The Red Right Hand is a horror film that takes place in 1978, and centers around five friends who reunite for their 15th high-school reunion. The film, starred John Doe, Edmund Lyndeck and Jeena Stern, was shot over 27 days and was primarily filmed in the old Metropolitan State Hospital in Waltham, Massachusetts. Its name was derived from the lyrics of a Nick Cave song.

Other projects
After leaving WFNX, St. Thomas went on to work for Clive Davis at Arista Records in 1995.

In 2001, he began working as an executive for the indie record label Tommy Boy Music. While at Tommy Boy, he directed music videos for the label's artists, Rustic Overtones.

Filmography
 (1999) Captive Audience
 (2004) The Red Right Hand
 (2008) City of Lost Carts 
 (2020) The Last

Discography
 Producer and host of Nirvana Nevermind It's an Interview
 Producer and host of The Breeders, The Secret History of The Breeders Both Verbal And Musical
 Producer and Host A Conversation With Frank Black

References

Radio personalities from Boston
Ashland University alumni
Living people
1963 births
American radio DJs
American music industry executives
American film directors